Teinopalpus aureus, the golden Kaiser-i-Hind, is a species of butterfly in the family Papilionidae. It is found in China and possibly Vietnam. Considered an endangered species threatened by the wildlife trade, it is protected by Chinese law.

Subspecies
 T. a. aureus
 T. a. hainanensis (Bauer & Frankenbach, 1998)
 T. a. laotiana
 T. a. nagaoi
 T. a. shinkaii

References

Erich Bauer and Thomas Frankenbach, 1998 Schmetterlinge der Erde, Butterflies of the world Part I (1), Papilionidae Papilionidae I: Papilio, Subgenus Achillides, Bhutanitis, Teinopalpus. Edited by  Erich Bauer and Thomas Frankenbach.  Keltern : Goecke & Evers ; Canterbury : Hillside Books  
Turlin, B.,1991 Notes sur les especes du genre Teinopalpus Hope et description de deux nouvelles sous-especes et d'une forme appartenant a ce genre. (Lepidoptera Papilionidae). Bulletin de la Société Sciences Nat 70:3-8.

External links

Butterflies of Indochina Images
External image

Teinopalpus
Butterflies of Asia
Butterflies of Indochina
Lepidoptera of Nepal
Endangered fauna of Asia
Taxonomy articles created by Polbot
Butterflies described in 1923